War of the Wolf is the eleventh historical novel in The Saxon Stories series by Bernard Cornwell.  It was first published in October 2018.

It is set in 10th-century England and continues to follow the fortunes of the fictional Uhtred of Bebbanburg.  In this novel Uhtred is finally secure in his childhood home, Bebbanburg.  It is the next stage in a long story that has many fans.

Plot
Æthelflaed, Uhtred's on-again, off-again lover and ruler of Mercia, dies. Edward, King of Wessex, seizes the opportunity to take over her kingdom. Uhtred ignores Edward's summons to swear fealty to him, and his Mercian lands are forfeited, but Uhtred is content with his beloved Bebbanburg.

Yet he still feels bound by an oath he took to protect Æthelstan, his friend, protege and Edward's oldest son. So when there is a Mercian revolt against Edward, he rides with Finan and about 90 veteran warriors to relieve the siege of Ceaster. When he gets there, he realises he has been lied to; the besieged, led by Æthelstan, were in no real danger, and the enemy are soon defeated.

It becomes clear that the revolt was fomented by Æthelhelm the Younger in an attempt to kill Æthelstan. Æthelstan and his younger half-brother Ælfweard are the main candidates to succeed the ailing Edward. Æthelstan is the first born, but there are (lying) rumours that his mother and Edward were not married. Æthelhelm is related by blood to Ælfweard, and has accused Uhtred of poisoning his father; Æthelhelm the Elder had been held for ransom, but sickened and died after the instalment had been paid. So Uhtred becomes unwillingly entangled once more in the affairs of Mercia and Wessex.

Ingilmundr, a Norse leader driven out of Ireland, seeks to settle in Æthelstan's realm. He informs Uhtred that his treacherous uncle, Sköll Grimmarson, is the one who lured Uhtred away from his home, to weaken Sigtryggr, King of Northumbria and Uhtred's son-in-law. Uhtred eventually discovers that Sköll is planning a surprise winter attack on Eoferwic, Sigtryggr's capital. As Uhtred races there, he spots Sköll and his men coming the other way with plundered cattle, women and children. Outnumbered, Uhtred ambushes the warriors at the rear, seriously wounds a skilled young warrior he later learns is Sköll's son, and takes two prisoners for questioning. He learns that Sköll was defeated, but Sköll and his son killed Stiorra, Uhtred's beloved daughter and Sigtryggr's wife. She was leading the defenders, as Sigtryggr was away. Sköll pursues Uhtred and his men, but Uhtred is reinforced by warriors led by Osferth, Alfred the Great's bastard oldest son. Uhtred calls a truce to see the man who killed his daughter, but Osferth refuses to get dragged into a Northumbrian conflict, so there is no fighting.

Uhtred learns that Edward has called a Witan at Tamweorthin, summoning Sigtryggr, but not him. He goes anyway. Eadgifu, Edward's wife, tries subtly enlisting his support against their mutual enemy, Æthelhelm, who is there. Æthelhelm tries to have him killed, but fails. Sigtryggr agrees to a treaty with Edward so that he can turn his full attention to avenging his wife. Then Æthelstan swears an oath to never fight against Uhtred or invade Northumbria (if he becomes king of Wessex) while Uhtred lives; in exchange, he gets Uhtred to swear to try to kill Æthelhelm.

Uhtred and Sigtryggr try to find Sköll, but have little luck. Sköll's warriors do not desert him, despite his failures, because they fear his sorcerer, Snorri. Sköll even gains new followers. Finally, Uhtred learns Sköll's stronghold is at Heahburh.

He and Sigtryggr lead nearly 500 warriors there, but their assault fails, and both Uhtred and Sigtryggr are wounded. Their situation is dire, as they are outnumbered, and retreating would be perilous. Then Snorri comes outside the fortress and starts cursing them. The half-mad, self-styled bishop Ieremias engages in a war of cursing and scores a victory of sorts, when Snorri's dog deserts him for the bishop. This enrages some of Sköll's wolf-warriors, half-crazed from applying an ointment of henbane. They charge out as a disorganised rabble, but are defeated by a disciplined shield wall. Then, something unexpected happens. Berg becomes separated from the rest of Uhtred's men during the fighting. He finds his two older brothers in Sköll's fortress and persuades them to switch sides. With their help, Uhtred and Sigtryggr's warriors force their way inside, and Sköll's men either die or surrender. Sköll himself pretends to surrender, then tries to kill Sigtryggr, but Uhtred saves his son-in-law. Uhtred disables Sköll in single combat, then invites Sigtyrggr to avenge his wife, but not before he disarms Sköll, thus ensuring that Sköll will not go to Valhalla.

References

2018 British novels
The Saxon Stories
Novels set in Northumberland
Novels set in the 10th century
HarperCollins books